The Dead Zone is a science fiction thriller novel by Stephen King published in 1979. The story follows Johnny Smith, who awakens from a coma of nearly five years and, apparently as a result of brain damage, now experiences clairvoyant and precognitive visions triggered by touch. When some information is blocked from his perception, Johnny refers to that information as being trapped in the part of his brain that is permanently damaged, "the dead zone." The novel also follows a serial killer in Castle Rock, and the life of rising politician Greg Stillson, both of whom are evils Johnny must eventually face. 

Though earlier King books were successful, The Dead Zone was the first of his novels to rank among the ten best-selling novels of the year in the United States. The book was nominated for the Locus Award in 1980 and was dedicated to King's son Owen. The Dead Zone is the first story by King to feature the fictional town of Castle Rock, which serves as the setting for several later stories and is referenced in others. The TV series Castle Rock takes place in this fictional town and makes references to the Strangler whom Johnny helped track down in The Dead Zone.

The Dead Zone is King's seventh novel and the fifth under his own name. The book spawned a 1983 film adaptation as well as a television series.

Plot summary
As a child in 1953, Johnny Smith falls unconscious while ice-skating, then mumbles a prophetic warning to an adult who later suffers an accident. In an unconnected incident, a young, emotionally troubled door-to-door Bible salesman named Greg Stillson vindictively kicks a dog to death.

By 1970, Johnny is a high school teacher in the small town of Cleaves Mills, Maine with a new girlfriend named Sarah. After winning repeatedly at a carnival wheel of fortune, Johnny is involved in a car accident and falls into a coma. Waking up over four years later, Johnny finds that he has suffered a neural injury, with one part of his brain seriously damaged, making it a "dead zone." As if to compensate, other parts of the brain now show heightened activity. As a result, Johnny sometimes experiences clairvoyant visions when touching people and objects. After helping various people, Johnny becomes frustrated by sensationalistic media reports of his supposed psychic talents. After Johnny rejects a lucrative offer from tabloid reporter Richard Dees to run fake predictions under his name, Dees' paper denounces him as a fraud. Relieved, Johnny hopes to resume a normal life as a teacher despite ongoing, severe headaches. The community fears him but Sarah visits. She and Johnny are about to consummate their romance, but Sarah then makes it clear that she has a new life with a husband Walt and their child. Sheriff George Bannerman of Castle Rock asks Johnny to help catch a local serial killer. After a nine-year-old girl is murdered, Johnny investigates and reluctantly identifies the Castle Rock Strangler as Bannerman's deputy Frank Dodd, who commits suicide after leaving a confession. As Johnny feared, the incident reignites the public's interest in his power and he is seen as too controversial to return to teaching.

Greg Stillson, now a successful businessman and mayor of Ridgeway, New Hampshire, threatens to kill the people he bullies if they reveal his actions or don't aid him. In 1976, he wins a seat in the U.S. House of Representatives as an independent, having blackmailed a local businessman into raising funds for him. Johnny becomes a private tutor to a teenage boy in Ridgeway and develops an interest in politics. He meets Stillson, and is horrified to see a vision of an older Stillson, now President, causing a worldwide nuclear conflict. As Johnny's health worsens, he contemplates Stillson's presidency, comparing his dilemma to someone with the ability to time travel having the opportunity to kill Hitler in 1932. Rather than assassinate Stillson to ensure the vision does not come true, Johnny procrastinates because of doubt in his vision, his abhorrence of murder, and his belief that there is no urgent need to act immediately since he has met an FBI agent investigating Stillson as a possible threat.

The FBI agent is killed by a car bomb. Meanwhile, Johnny's warnings that a disaster will occur at his pupil's graduation party are ignored by some, leading to several deaths. Now believing he must take more decisive action to prevent nuclear war, and learning his headaches are the result of a brain tumor, Johnny buys a rifle to kill Stillson. At the next rally, Stillson begins his speech and Johnny shoots from a balcony. He misses and is wounded by guards. Stillson grabs a young child and holds him up as a human shield. A bystander photographs Stillson's act. Unable to shoot a child, Johnny is shot twice by the bodyguards. He falls off the balcony, mortally wounded. Dying, Johnny touches Stillson a final time. He feels only dwindling impressions but knows the terrible future has been prevented. When published, the picture of Stillson using a child as a shield ends his political career.

An epilogue intersperses excerpts of letters from Johnny to his loved ones, a "Q & A" transcript of a purported Senate committee (chaired by real-life Maine Senator William Cohen) investigation of Johnny's attempt to assassinate Stillson, and a narrative of Sarah's visit to Johnny's grave. Sarah feels a brief moment of psychic contact with Johnny's spirit and, comforted, drives away.

Reception 
Christopher Lehmann-Haupt of The New York Times compared reading the novel to the experience of watching "a particularly compelling movie", which he said is evidence of the novel's entertainment value, even if it does not speak of its literary value.  The Washington Posts reviewer wrote, "It is not a book that will please everyone, but those who like it will probably like it a lot."  In a retrospective review, James Smythe of The Guardian wrote that The Dead Zone had become one of his favorite King novels after rereading it. Smythe said that although the novel seems to have no clear antagonist throughout the first two-thirds, it reveals itself as "a more literary novel about rehabilitation and loss".

The Dead Zone received the following accolades: Locus Award Nominee for Best Fantasy Novel (1980), World Fantasy Award Nominee for Best Novel (1980), and Balrog Award Nominee for Best Novel (1980).

Despite the above, the American Library Association named The Dead Zone the 82nd-most banned and challenged book in the United States between 1990 and 1999.

Adaptations

Film

In 1983, the novel was adapted by screenwriter Jeffrey Boam into a film of the same name, starring Christopher Walken as Johnny and Martin Sheen as Greg Stillson. It was directed by David Cronenberg. In the movie adaptation, the phrase "dead zone" does not refer to the part of Johnny's brain that is damaged. Instead, it refers to the blind spots in Johnny's visions of the future. Since they don't appear in visions of the past or events that are occurring in the present, Johnny concludes the "dead zone" blindspots represent that the future is not set and can be altered.

Television

The television series The Dead Zone began broadcasting in late 2002, airing on the USA Network and starring Anthony Michael Hall as Johnny, Nicole de Boer as Sarah, and Sean Patrick Flanery as Greg Stillson. In the TV series, the phrase "dead zone" does not refer to the part of Johnny's brain that is damaged but instead to the previously "dormant" part of his brain that awakens and causes his psychic abilities. It is shown that others before and after Johnny who suffered similar injuries also have their "dead zones" awakened and experience the same psychic abilities.

Sarah's husband Walt and the character of Sheriff George Bannerman were combined for the TV show into a new character Walt Bannerman, who marries Sarah during Johnny's coma and is the local sheriff. Walt regularly works with Johnny, the two combining police resources and psychic visions to solve many cases. While in the book, Sarah and Johnny only share a kiss before his coma, the TV series depicts them as childhood friends who then become long time lovers and conceive a child before Johnny's accident. When Johnny awakens from his coma, he learns he and Sarah have a son, Johnny or "JJ", who is being raised by her and Walt. Among the supporting cast, Johnny's physical therapist Bruce becomes his best friend and most trusted aid during his adventures and his eventual investigation of Stillson. A season 2 episode reveals that if Johnny and Bruce had never met, then Johnny would have become an isolated loner who dies while attempting to assassinate Stillson at a rally, just as occurred in the book.

References

1979 American novels
American thriller novels
Novels by Stephen King
American novels adapted into films
Novels about precognition
Viking Press books
Fiction set in 1979
Novels set in Maine
American novels adapted into television shows